Vilazodone, sold under the brand name Viibryd among others, is a medication used to treat major depressive disorder. It is taken by mouth.

Common side effects include nausea, diarrhea, and trouble sleeping. Serious side effects may include increased suicidal thoughts or actions in those under the age of 25, serotonin syndrome, bleeding, mania, pancreatitis, and SIADH. Vilazodone may cause less emotional blunting than typical SSRIs and SNRIs. A withdrawal syndrome may occur if the dose is rapidly decreased. Use during pregnancy and breastfeeding is not generally recommended. It is in the serotonin modulator class of medications and is believed to work both as an SSRI and activator of the 5-HT1A receptor.

Vilazodone was approved for medical use in the United States in 2011 and in Canada in 2018. In 2019, it was the 334th most commonly prescribed medication in the United States, with more than 900thousand prescriptions. The drug lost patent protection in June 2022 for adults, and is scheduled to lose exclusivity for pediatrics in July 2023. Generic versions have been approved by the U.S. Food and Drug Administration (FDA).

Medical uses
Seven controlled efficacy trials were conducted of vilazodone for treatment of major depressive disorder (MDD). Five of these trials showed no significant influence of vilazodone over placebo on depressive symptoms. In the remaining two trials, small but significant advantages of vilazodone over placebo were found. According to these two eight-week trials in adults, vilazodone has an antidepressant response after one week of treatment. After eight weeks it resulted in a 13% greater response than placebo. Remission rates, however, were not significantly different versus placebo.

According to FDA staff in 2011, "it is unknown whether vilazodone has any advantages compared to other drugs in the antidepressant class." A 2019 review stated that "present studies do not suggest the superiority of vilazodone compared with other antidepressants."

Development of vilazodone for generalized anxiety disorder (GAD) has been stopped as of 2017. While there is tentative evidence of a small benefit in GAD, there is a high rate of side effects.

Adverse effects
On September 6, 2016, the FDA wrote a letter to Forest Labs requiring a new warning to be added to the label related to a link between the drug and acute pancreatitis and sleep paralysis.

After a one-year, open-label study assessing the safety and tolerability of vilazodone in people with major depressive disorder, the most common adverse effects were diarrhea (35.7%), nausea (31.6%), and headache (20.0%); greater than 90% of these adverse effects were mild or moderate. In randomized controlled trials, meanwhile, these rates were 28%, 23.4% and 13.3%, respectively. In contrast to other SSRIs, initial trials showed that vilazodone did not cause decreased sexual desire/function, which often cause people to abandon their use. Additionally, Vilazodone may cause less emotional blunting than typical SSRIs and SNRIs.
Incidence of adverse effects include:

Very common adverse effects (incidence >10%)
 Nausea
 Diarrhea
 Headache

Common adverse effects (1–10% incidence)

 Vomiting
 Dry mouth
 Dizziness
 Insomnia

Uncommon adverse effects (0.1–1% incidence)

 Somnolence
 Paraesthesia
 Tremor
 Abnormal dreams
 Libido decreased
 Restlessness
 Akathisia
 Restless legs syndrome
 Abnormal orgasms (men only)
 Delayed ejaculations (men only)
 Erectile dysfunction (men only)
 Fatigue
 Feeling jittery
 Palpitations
 Ventricular premature contractions
 Arthralgia
 Increased appetite

Rare adverse effects (<0.1% incidence)
 Serotonin syndrome—a serious adverse effect characterised by:
Nausea
Vomiting
Mental status change (e.g. confusion, hallucinations, agitation, coma, stupor)
Muscle rigidity
Tremor
Myoclonus
Hyperreflexia—overresponsive/overactive reflexes
Hyperthermia—elevated body temperature
Autonomic instability (e.g. tachycardia, dizziness, abnormally excessive sweating, etc.)
 Mania/hypomania—a potentially dangerously elated/agitated mood. Every antidepressant has the potential to induce these psychiatric reactions. They are particularly problematic in those with a history of hypomania/mania such as those with bipolar disorder.

Unknown-incidence adverse effects
 Suicidal ideation—all antidepressants can cause suicidal ideation especially in young adults and adolescents under the age of 25.
 Abnormal bleeding—the SSRIs are known for their ability to increase the incidence of gastrointestinal bleeds and other bleeding abnormalities.
 Seizures
 Syndrome of inappropriate antidiuretic hormone secretion (SIADH)—a condition characterised by an abnormally excessive secretion of antidiuretic hormone causing potentially-fatal electrolyte abnormalities (such as hyponatraemia).
 Hyponatraemia (a complication of the former)—low blood sodium.

Pregnancy
Antidepressant exposure (including vilazodone) is associated with shorter average duration of pregnancy (by three days), increased risk of preterm delivery (by 55%), lower birth weight (by 75 g), and lower Apgar scores (by <0.4 points). It is uncertain whether there is an increased rate of septal heart defects among children whose mothers were prescribed an SSRI in early pregnancy.

Pharmacology

Pharmacodynamics
Vilazodone acts as a serotonin reuptake inhibitor (IC50 = 2.1 nM; Ki = 0.1 nM) and 5-HT1A receptor partial agonist (IC50 = 0.2 nM; IA = ~60–70%). It has negligible affinity for other serotonin receptors such as 5-HT1D, 5-HT2A, and 5-HT2C. It also exhibits inhibitory activity at the norepinephrine and dopamine transporters (Ki = 56 nM for NET and 37 nM for DAT). A small clinical study found occupancy of the 5-HT1A receptor with vilazodone, whereas occupancy of the SERT by vilazodone in humans does not seem to have been studied.

Pharmacokinetics
Vilazodone is best absorbed with food and has a bioavailability of 72% under fed conditions. The Cmax increased between 147 to 160% and the AUC increased between 64 to 85% of vilazodone when it was administered with either a fatty or light meal.

History
It was developed by Merck KGaA and licensed by Clinical Data, a biotech company purchased by Forest Laboratories in 2011.

Research 
While it was being studied for generalized anxiety disorder, such research had stopped as of 2017.

References

External links 
 
 

AbbVie brands
Benzofuran-2-carboxamides
Benzonitriles
CYP2D6 inhibitors
Indoles
Merck brands
Piperazines
Serotonin receptor agonists
Serotonin reuptake inhibitors
Wikipedia medicine articles ready to translate